Rowham Beyk Mahalleh (also Romanized as Rowhām Beyk Maḩalleh; also known as Rahāmbak Maḩalleh and Rowḩām Beyg Maḩalleh) is a village in Asalem Rural District, Asalem District, Talesh County, Gilan Province, Iran. At the 2006 census, its population was 248, in 66 families.

References 

Populated places in Talesh County